Richard Kenneth Fox, Jr. (October 22, 1925 – April 9, 2017) was United States Ambassador to Trinidad and Tobago (1977–79). He was born in Cincinnati, Ohio in October 1925.  He was a member of the American Academy of Diplomacy. He died in April 2017 at the age of 91.

References

1925 births
2017 deaths
Ambassadors of the United States to Trinidad and Tobago
People from Cincinnati